Allobates talamancae (common names: Talamanca rocket frog, striped rocket frog, Talamanca striped rocket frog) is a species of frog in the family Aromobatidae. It is found in northwestern Ecuador, western Colombia, Panama, Costa Rica, and southern Nicaragua.

Description
The dorsum is smooth and dark brown in color. The flanks are black, bordered by tan or bronze line above and a white line below. The ventrum is white. The fingers and toes are unwebbed.

Reproduction
Allobates talamancae lay the eggs in the leaf-litter, and both parents carry the tadpoles to streams where they complete their development in small, water-filled depressions.

Habitat, ecology, and conservation
Allobates talamancae  is found in a variety of habitats in very humid lowland and premontane habitats (secondary growth and plantations, swampy areas in primary forest, but not in open areas), usually close to streams. Its diet consists of small arthropods. Adult frogs are found to aggregate, forming small groups, likely as an anti-predator adaptation.

It is common species; threats to it are habitat loss, introduction of alien predatory fish, and pollution.

References

talamancae
Amphibians of Colombia
Amphibians of Costa Rica
Amphibians of Ecuador
Amphibians of Nicaragua
Amphibians of Panama
Amphibians described in 1875
Taxa named by Edward Drinker Cope
Taxonomy articles created by Polbot